Chen Jianbin (born June 27, 1970) is a Chinese actor active in television and film. He is most notable for the portrayal of Cao Cao in the 2010 television series Three Kingdoms; as well as his performance in Decade of Marriage, Qiao's Grand Courtyard and Empresses in the Palace.

Chen married his Qiao's Grand Courtyard costar Jiang Qinqin in 2006.

Filmography

Film

Television series

Accolades

References

External links

Male actors from Xinjiang
Chinese male television actors
Central Academy of Drama alumni
Hui male actors
Living people
1970 births
People from Ürümqi
Chinese male film actors
Chinese male stage actors
20th-century Chinese male actors
21st-century Chinese male actors